The Great Indian Dysfunctional Family is a 2018 Hindi web series created by Dipika Bajpai for video on demand platform ALTBalaji. The series stars Kay Kay Menon and Barun Sobti as protagonists and revolves around the relationships between the brothers and their families, heartbreaks and breakdowns.

The series is available for streaming on the ALT Balaji App and its associated websites since its release date.

Plot
The series revolves around a fictional modern Ranaut family. The series explores the estranged relationships between two brothers Samar Ranaut (Barun Sobti) and Vikram Ranauat (Kay Kay Menon). The series starts when Samar, Vikram's estranged brother returns home with his wife after having fled both from home and the army 8 years ago. After his return begins an unusual family reunion that escalates into a series of heartbreaks, betrayals, and emotional breakdowns, questioning the trust in every relationship.

Cast
 Kay Kay Menon as Vikram Ranaut (Ex.Army Officer), Samar's elder brother
 Barun Sobti as Samar Ranaut, Vikram's younger brother
 Swaroop Sampat as Premlata Ranaut, mother of Vikram and Samar
 Shriswara as Geeta Ranaut, wife of Vikram Ranaut
 Eisha Chopra as Sonali Ranaut, wife of Samar Ranaut
 Sanaya Pithawalla as Aditi Ranaut (daughter of Vikram and Geeta Ranaut) 
 Prithviraj Sarnaik as Mridual Ranaut (son of Vikram and Geeta Ranaut)

Episodes
 Episode 1: Meet The Ranauts.
 Episode 2: The Wedding Fiasco.
 Episode 3: The Aftermath.
 Episode 4: A Deadly Secret.
 Episode 5: Wounds of the Past.
 Episode 6: It Happened One Night.
 Episode 7: Testing Times.
 Episode 8: The Beginning of the End.
 Episode 9: A Life Less Ordinary.
 Episode 10: A Glimmer of Hope.

Reception 
Nicole of The Quint writes "Beyond its contemporary packaging, TGIDF doesn’t reinvent the wheel. But it’s entertaining nonetheless much in a way that watching a mindless Bollywood flick is."

References

External links
 Watch The Great Indian Dysfunctional Family on ALT Balaji website
 

2018 web series debuts
Hindi-language web series
ALTBalaji original programming
Indian drama web series